King of Memphis may refer to:

 Young Dolph - Adolph Robert Thornton Jr. (July 27, 1985 – November 17, 2021)
 King of Memphis (album), an album by Young Dolph